A Syce (Groom) Holding Two Carriage Horses is a watercolor painting by Shaikh Muhammad Amir of Karraya. The painting was finished circa 1845 in Calcutta, India.  It is now in the Metropolitan Museum of Art in New York.  It is an example of Company painting by Indian artists for the British in India. 

The work is on view in the Metropolita Museum's Gallery 464.

References

Indian paintings
Paintings in the collection of the Metropolitan Museum of Art
Watercolor paintings
Horses in art